Techman Robot Inc., formerly a business division of Quanta Storage Inc., is an independent company under Quanta Computer established in 2015. The company is most recognized for its cobot with a built-in vision system – the TM Robot series, which previously won the COMPUTEX D&I Gold Award. Techman Robot Inc. is also among the first companies to receive the TARS certification.

Techman Robot Inc. is headquartered in Taiwan and has overseas branches in Shanghai, Shenzhen, Chongqing, Busan, and Alblasserdam. The company also partners with distributors in the United States, Europe, China, Japan, South Korea, and Southeast Asia.

Overview
According to Nikkei Asia they are "a leader in the field of collaborative robots."

Founded as a subsidiary of Quanta in 2016 Techman is based in Taoyuan's Hwa Ya Technology Park. Quanta head Barry Lam has a mobile Techman robot in his office which serves refreshments to guests.

History
Techman Robot Inc., a former business division of Quanta Storage Inc. (TWSE 6188), was founded as an independent subsidiary in 2015.

Mr. Shi-chi Ho, General Manager of Quanta Storage Inc. at the time, established a robotics laboratory as a business division for the company in 2012. The laboratory developed the first collaborative robot (cobot) with a built-in vision system – the TM5 – in 2014. The TM5 was subsequently unveiled at the International Robot Exhibition (iREX) held in Tokyo, Japan, in 2015.

The first commercial TM5 was shipped at the end of 2016, and the company became the world's second-largest cobot brand by 2018.

Techman Robot signed an MOU with automated product giant Omron in Kyoto on 11 May 2018, committing to the promotion of cobots to various industries worldwide.

At the end of 2019, the TM AI+ software solution was introduced  to expand cobot applications from pick-and-place  to product inspection. The TM AI+ has now been widely incorporated in the semiconductor and logistics industries.

By 2019 it was the world's second largest manufacturer of cobots after Universal Robots. As of 2021 they were still the second largest manufacturer of cobots with 10% of the market share to Universal Robotic’s 50%.

In 2021 Omron and Techman announced that Omron would be acquiring a 10% stake in Techman. The value of the investment was undisclosed.

Leadership
Haw Chen is the CEO of Techman.

Collaborations
Techman is working with Vincennes University and Telamon Robotics to develop a cobot training curriculum.

Products
TM Robot Series
TM Operator Series
TM Smart Factory Series

Industrial Applications

Manufacturing

TM Robot is suitable for manufacturing a wide range of products, including automobiles, electronics, semiconductors, machinery, home appliances, furniture, toys, and apparel. It can also be applied to streamline the production lines of metal and plastic products, parts, and accessories.

Catering

TM Robots can be applied in restaurants and kitchens to streamline catering processes.

Warehousing

TM Robots make up for the lack of transporters and movers in the logistics and warehousing industries. They can be equipped on AGVs or AMRs to facilitate logistical operations.

Entertainment

TM Robots can be used to carry heavy camera equipment and maneuvered through narrow spaces, providing the freedom and flexibility for videographers to capture unique or fast-paced shots.

Education

Students and researchers can use TM cobots to learn about robotics and programming. TM cobots support manual programming instruction for students to move the arm manually or remotely while recording or saving relevant coordinates, which is used at a later stage to recreate certain motions.

Major Milestones

2012~2013
Robot Laboratory is established as a new business unit at Quanta Storage Inc.
First SCARA Robot and Dual-Arm SCARA are developed.

2014
Robot Business Division- is formally established.

2015
The first TM5 collaborative robot was born.
TM5 is unveiled at the 2015 iRex exhibition in Tokyo.
Techman Electronics Inc. is established.

2016
Techman Electronics is formally renamed Techman Robot Inc.
TM5 is officially released to the market.
Techman Robot attends the TAIROS exhibition and CIIF in Shanghai

2017
Techman Robot Inc. attends the Hannover Messe exhibition and expands into the European market.

2018
Techman Robot Inc. becomes the second-largest cobot brand in the world.
Techman Robot Inc. attends the IMTS exhibition and expands into the US market.
TM5 is awarded the 2018 Red Dot Design Award, iF Design Award, and 2018 Taiwan Excellence Award.
TM12, TM14, and TM Manager are officially announced.
Techman Robot Inc. signs an MOU with Omron.

2019
TM Palletizing Operator is officially announced.
Established Techman Robot (Shanghai) Subsidiary Company.

2020
TM AI+ is officially announced.
Overseas branch offices are established in South Korea and the Netherlands.
TM12 is awarded the 2020 Taiwan Excellence Award.

Awards

International Certification and Patents
Techman Robot Inc. has secured patents in Taiwan, the United States, and China. Its cobots have received TARS, ISO10218-1, and ISO/TS15066 certification, and its factories comply with ISO9001 and ISO14001 specifications.

References

Taiwanese companies established in 2016
Companies based in Taoyuan City
Robotics companies
Engineering companies of Taiwan
Industrial machine manufacturers
Industrial robotics companies